William Gore may refer to:

William Gore (15th-century MP) for Maldon
Sir William Gore, 3rd Baronet (died 1700), Irish Custos Rotulorum of Leitrim
William Gore (died 1739) (c. 1675–1739), English MP for Colchester, Cricklade and St Albans
William Gore (Lord Mayor of London) (1644–1708), Lord Mayor of London 1701
William Crampton Gore (1871–1946), Irish artist
Bill Gore (1912–1986), American chemical engineer
William Gore Ouseley (1797–1866), British diplomat
William Gore (bishop) (died 1784), Irish Anglican bishop
William Gore (priest) (died 1731), Church of Ireland priest
William Gore (provost marshal) (1765–1845), British government official in Australia
William D. Gore, Sheriff of San Diego County since 2009
Willem Baa Nip (1836 – 1885), also known as King Billy, William Gore or Billy Wa-wha, a member of the Wathaurung

Parliament of Ireland 
William Gore (died 1730), MP for Leitrim 1703–1730, Donegal Borough
William Gore (1703–1748), MP for Kilkenny City
William Gore (1709–1769), MP for Leitrim 1730–1760 and 1768–1769
William Gore (1744–1815), MP for Leitrim 1769–1776
William Gore (1767–1832), MP for Carrick

See also
William Ormsby-Gore (disambiguation)